EMI Music Poland Sp. z o.o., was a Polish subsidiary of EMI Group Limited, it was founded in 1995 in Warsaw. Labels CEO was Piotr Kabaj.

The label was founded in 1995 when EMI bought independent record label Kompania Muzyczna Pomaton (founded 1990). The purchase included rights for recordings by such artists as Tadeusz Woźniak, Jacek Wójcicki, Przemysław Gintrowski, Wolna Grupa Bukowina and Magda Umer among others.

In 2012 EMI was sold to Universal Music Group. The European Union required UMG to sell several owned labels to other parties, including Parlophone and EMI Music Poland, with Warner Music Group buying most of those labels in 2013.  EMI Music Poland was then renamed Parlophone Music Poland. In 2014 Parlophone Music Poland was merged with Warner Music Poland.

In early 2000s EMI Music Poland run hip-hop subsidiary Baza Lebel  with such artists as Mor W.A., Molesta Ewenement, Zipera, Electric Rudeboyz, Vienio & Pele, Peel Motyff and Pare Słów among others.

Label over the years distributed in Poland albums released by My Music, Lemon Records, Kayax, and labels from parent company EMI Group Limited among others.

Selected artists

Agnieszka Chylińska
Anita Lipnicka
Aleksandra Jabłonka
Bajm 
Blue Café
Dżem 
Elektryczne Gitary
Feel   
Goya  
Grzegorz Turnau
Grzegorz Markowski & Ryszard Sygitowicz
Iwona Węgrowska
Iza Lach
Justyna Steczkowska
Katarzyna Klich
Kasia Stankiewicz
Kroke
Lidia Kopania
Madox 
Marika
Marysia Starosta
Mela Koteluk
Monika Kuszyńska
Myslovitz
My Riot
Natalia Lesz
Patrycja Kosiarkiewicz
Pati Yang
Patrycja Markowska
Perfect
Piotr Rubik
Ryszard Rynkowski
Stare Dobre Małżeństwo
T.Love
Video  
Wilki
Voo Voo
Wojciech Waglewski

See also
 BMG Poland
 PolyGram Poland
 Sony Music Entertainment Poland
 Sony BMG Music Entertainment Poland
 Universal Music Poland

References

1995 establishments in Poland
2013 disestablishments in Poland
EMI
Polish record labels